Fury (retitled Brave Stallion in syndicated reruns) is an American Western television series that aired on NBC from 1955 to 1960. It stars Peter Graves as Jim Newton, who operates the Broken Wheel Ranch in California; Bobby Diamond as Jim's adopted son, Joey Clark Newton, and William Fawcett as ranch hand Pete Wilkey. Roger Mobley co-starred in the two final seasons as Homer "Packy" Lambert, a friend of Joey's.

The frequent introduction to the show depicts the beloved stallion running inside the corral and approaching the camera as the announcer reads: "FURY!...The story of a horse...and a boy who loves him." Fury is the first American series to be produced originally by Television Programs of America and later by the British-based company ITC Entertainment.

Outdoor footage for the series was filmed primarily on the Iverson Movie Ranch in Chatsworth, California, throughout the five-season run of the series, with some of the earliest footage for the series shot on the Garner Ranch in Idyllwild, California. One episode, "Packy, the Lion Tamer", which premiered on January 2, 1960, included footage shot at Jungleland USA in Thousand Oaks, California, and occasional footage appearing during the series was shot at Corriganville Movie Ranch near Simi Valley, California.

Synopsis
The story begins with two young boys fighting on the street. As Joey Clark, the winner of the exchange, walks away, the loser attempts to throw something at him, but the object goes through a nearby window. The store owner quickly pins the blame on Joey, who has been labeled a troublemaker from past incidents. Rancher Jim Newton witnesses the incident and follows along as Joey is taken before the judge to clear the boy's name.  After learning that Joey is an orphan, Newton takes him home to his Broken Wheel Ranch and begins adoption proceedings.

A typical plot involved a guest star who falls into mischief or was rebellious or disorderly, and got into trouble, but is subsequently rescued by Fury. In most episodes, Fury allowed only Joey to ride him, but occasionally others were allowed the honor of mounting Fury if they had done a good deed for the horse. One of the original concepts of the show was that Fury remained a "wild" (untamed) horse, that would not allow anyone but Joey to ride him or even come near him. In several episodes, people would see the calm interaction between the horse "and the boy who loved him," and assume that the horse must be broken, but when they tried to put a saddle on him, Fury would rear up and attack them.

Numerous episodes focus on youth organizations, including the Boy Scouts, Big Brothers, Junior Achievement,  4-H Club, Little League, and even the Girl Scouts. A 1957 episode is dedicated to Fire Prevention Week.

Ann Robinson played Joey Newton's dedicated teacher, Helen Watkins, in nine episodes of the first season. In addition to Roger Mobley as Packy Lambert, another friend of Joey's is portrayed in the series by child actor Jimmy Baird (born 1948), who was cast as Rodney "Pee Wee" Jenkins. James Seay portrayed a sheriff in six episodes. Maudie Prickett was cast twice, once in the title role of "Aunt Harriet" (1958).

Among the other guest stars were Shelley Fabares as Midge Mallon in "The Tomboy" (1957), Tony Young in "Timber Walker" (1959), Lee Van Cleef as Race Collins in "House Guests" (1959), and Walter Maslow in "The Relay Station" (1959).

Jim Bannon appeared twice on Fury, once as a prison warden in the episode "Fish Story" (1958). Andy Clyde was cast in "Fury Runs to Win" (1956) and "Black Gold" (1959). Russ Conway was cast in "Joey Goes Hunting" (1955) and "A Present for Packy" (1960). Nan Leslie was cast twice on Fury, as Stella Lambert in "The Model Plane" (1958) and as Packy's mother in "The Pulling Contest" (1959). Paul Picerni of "Untouchables" fame, portrayed Tupelo in "Packy, the Lion Tamer" (1960). He also appeared in "An Old Indian Trick" (1959). John M. Pickard, star of the syndicated Boots and Saddles western series, appeared in the episodes "Timber" (1956) and "Trail Drive" (1959). Will Wright, known for his curmudgeonly roles, was cast in "Ghost Town" (1955) and "The Meanest Man" (1958).

Much of the outdoor footage was shot on the Iverson Movie Ranch in Chatsworth, where the "Fury Set" was built in 1955, specifically for the series. This set included a small house, a cabin, corrals, and other features, but it was dominated by a large barn. In addition to being used throughout five seasons of Fury, the set was used in many films, including Fury at Showdown (1957) and The 30 Foot Bride of Candy Rock (1959), and in other television series, including Bonanza and Cimarron Strip, before it burned to the ground in the massive Newhall/Malibu fire of fall 1970.

Cast
The cast included:

 Peter Graves: Jim Newton
 Bobby Diamond: Joey Newton
 William Fawcett: Pete
 Ann Robinson: Helen Watkins
 Jimmy Baird: Pee Wee Jenkins
 Roger Mobley: Packey Lambert

Episode list

Season 1: 1955–56

Season 2: 1956–57

Season 3: 1957–58

Season 4: 1958–59

Season 5: 1959–60

Syndication
The series continued in reruns on NBC until 1966 and was syndicated throughout the 1960s and 1970s by ITC Entertainment, which produced the series. Season 1 now plays on STIRR from 2-3pm central time Sunday-Saturday.

See also
 List of fictional horses

References

External links
 
Broken Wheel Ranch - Home Of Fury
  A Fury scrapbook (fan site)
Behind-the-scenes production photos Collection of Stephen Lodge, nephew of the script supervisor.

1955 American television series debuts
1960 American television series endings
Black-and-white American television shows
Television series about horses
Television series by ITC Entertainment
NBC original programming
1950s Western (genre) television series
1960s Western (genre) television series
1950s American children's television series
1960s American children's television series